This is a list of characters from the Wild Cards book series.

Astronomer
The Astronomer first appeared in the short story "Pennies from Hell" by Lewis Shiner in Wild Cards II: Aces High, though his presence was implied in "The Long, Dark Night of Fortunato" in the first volume of the series.

He is the leader of a cult, known as the Egyptian Freemasons, that consists mainly of superhuman Aces and deformed Jokers. The Astronomer planned to conquer the world in the aftermath of an invasion by fungoid aliens called the Swarm. Unknown to him, the Shakti device of the Egyptian Freemasons lacked a power source and was designed to contact an alien organization, the Network. Once his plans were foiled, the Astronomer lived only for revenge.

The Astronomer is an old man (born in 1925), who has thinning white hair, wears glasses and is best described as "mole-like"; he is also noted as having a disproportionately large head, the upper part of which enlarges further when he is fully empowered. He has wiped his own memory of all events prior to becoming the Astronomer.

The Astronomer usually uses a wheelchair, although the proper use of his Ace powers can allow him to walk. The Astronomer practices a horrific form of death magic, gaining immense energy through the ritualistic slaying of his victims (usually young women). He greatly enjoys having Demise slowly kill the victims, taking their suffering in anticipation of death as his energy source.

Once the ritual is completed, the Astronomer is blessed with a huge energy reserve that allows him to utilize the following powers: astral projection, clairsentience, minor precognition, the ability to selectively erase memories, flight, invisibility from visual and mental senses, ego attacks, hand killing attacks, walking through walls, suppression of any single wildcard power directed against him, force fields, minor force walls, telepathy, and an assortment of energy blasts. However, he can not use all powers simultaneously. His powers resemble and possibly exceed those of Fortunato, making him one of the most powerful aces.

The Astronomer has lost his followers in attacks on the Egyptian Freemasons by Fortunato and several other Aces, while managing to escape and partially reform the cult. His activities culminate on the Wild Card Day 1986, the 40th anniversary of the virus' release. While his associates pursue the Turtle and Tachyon, the Astronomer picks several girls up for recharge. One of them is the niece of Sewer Jack, Cordelia Chaisson. As she "turns her ace" (the ability to shut down somebody's cardiac and respiratory systems) and Demise shifts his loyalty by interrupting the recharge, the Astronomer can block Demise's killing stare, but is left almost powerless and virtually dead by Cordelia.

After later recharge and the aerial battle with Fortunato, which leaves both Aces almost powerless, the Astronomer drops into the Hudson River and escapes to the shore for his final encounter with his former associates Roulette and Demise.
He uses his last bit of power to escape through a wall, where he is killed by Demise and left embedded inside the wall.

Although his crimes are publicly announced, a large part of the population ignores those announcements and considers the old man in the wall just a random victim of the killing spree of that day. The events of the day, including a public killing, death of a superhero Ace, and the battle over the Hudson, strengthen the prejudices against the Wild Cards and lead to the events of July 1988.

Black Eagle
Black Eagle (Earl Sanderson Jr.) is a member of the Four Aces. He was created by Walter Jon Williams, and first appeared in the story "Witness" in the first book of the series, Wild Cards.

Earl Sanderson Jr. was a member of the 332nd Fighter Group (the Tuskegee Airmen) during World War II. He was also a member of the American Communist Party, hoping to create a more equitable society for Black and White alike. During the first outbreak of the Wild Card virus on September 15, 1946, Earl was one of the lucky few who was neither killed nor deformed by the disease, instead gaining fantastic powers to become an Ace. He joined the Four Aces, and helped capture Nazi war criminals and topple tyrants; he even saved Gandhi from a fanatic's bullet, but back at home the political climate of America was changing. The Four Aces found themselves called before the dreaded HUAC (the House Un-American Activities Committee) where the former Communist Sanderson was torn to shreds on the stand by racist Congressmen. After the trial he escaped prison and fled the country.

He remained outside America for the rest of his life, despite receiving a pardon from President John F. Kennedy. He died in France in 1979 of a cerebral hemorrhage.

Aces Abroad notes that even after his death, Sanderson is revered in India for saving Gandhi's life, and a statue of him in an almost deific pose stands in a Calcutta shrine.

Black Eagle had the ability to telekinetically levitate himself and fly at speeds of up to 500 miles per hour. He also generated an invisible telekinetic force shield, which could resist machine-gun fire, and which he used as a battering ram while flying. He was also a talented airplane pilot.

Black Shadow
Shad is a vigilante created by Walter Jon Williams. Better known as Black Shadow, he first appeared in the short story "Strings" in the first Wild Cards anthology, and played a pivotal role in several of the later books of the series.

Black Shadow is an Ace, a victim of the alien Wild Card virus who has manifested superhuman powers, without physical deformities. He can absorb photons the visible range of light and heat, leaving only a sphere of blackness visible, and can incapacitate his foes with hypothermia. Shadow can use the absorbed energy to boost his strength and speed to superhuman levels, and can "see" in the dark because his vision extends into the infrared zone of the spectrum. He can also absorb other frequencies of the spectrum such as radar microwaves, but this requires a greater effort. Since most of his body's energy comes from electromagnetic spectrum absorption, he needs very little food. He can also cling to walls and ceilings, like the comic-book hero Spider-Man. Combining these powers with his ruthless attitude and criminal skills makes him one of the most effective Aces in the Wild Cards series.

Shad is the internal name of an ace who adopts multiple identities. Born Neil Langford, Shad was a mild mannered graduate student on his way to a physics PhD. Unknown to the general public, he was also an ace with a variety of powers Puppetman caused Langford to become consumed with rage and he murdered two criminals, stringing them up from a lamp post. After this Langford dropped out of school and began pursuing a career as the super powered vigilante Black Shadow. However, he also adopted various other identities, some once and others on a more regular basis.  Somewhere along the line he began to think of himself as "Shad". In the late 80s Shad was responsible for capturing Typhoid Croyd/The Sleeper and Snotman. In the early 90s Shad interacted with the Jokers on the Rox and was eventually imprisoned on Governors Island by the Card Sharks conspiracy. After escaping with several Aces he and fellow Ace Croyd Crenson sought revenge. Shad and Croyd were able to destroy the Card Sharks conspiracy, murdering the Jumpers, as well as several of the Card Sharks members and allies including Howard Hughes, and orchestrated the imprisonment of others.  Shad also tortured to death Gregg Hartmann who was Puppetman. In fact it was merely Hartmanns body into which Card Sharks agent George Gordon Battle had been jumped. When last seen Shad was contemplating travelling to Central Asia in order to kill the last remaining Card Sharks.

The most notable feature of Shad's character is his multiple personas. Some of these are adopted on the spur of the moment and quickly abandoned. Others involve a long-term commitment from Shad. By the time he appears in the books he apparently no longer maintains an identity as Neil Langford. His identities include:
 Black Shadow, a violent vigilante known for stringing criminals up from lamp posts.   
 Mr. Diamond, a wealthy diamond merchant who owns several properties. Diamond is a Nat (non-Wild Card) and seems to exist mostly to allow Shad to launder money and maintain property free from police interference.
 Wall Walker, a Jamaican Ace who can walk up walls but possesses none of Shads other powers.
 Mr. Gravemold, a Joker who can project cold. Shad masquerades as a joker by wearing a mask which supposedly covers a facial deformity and smothers himself in formaldehyde in order to produce a pungent smell. As he explains to Croyd, he is able to tolerate the smell because he snorts small amounts of cocaine before adopting the Gravemold persona.
 No Dice, a drug dealing "gangsta" that employed Shad's ability to absorb heat and induce hypothermia to eliminate his competition and terrorize local pimps. Something of a vigilante in his own right and more of a cover identity than a true personality. No Dice emerged as Shad's personalities were beginning to fuse together once more.

Blaise Jeannot Andrieux
Blaise Andrieux is the grandson of Dr. Tachyon, created by Melinda M. Snodgrass. Blaise's mother was Gisele Bacourt, who was Tachyon's illegitimate daughter. He was raised by a terrorist group who taught him to use his mental powers to dominate and to kill. When Tachyon discovered Blaise's existence during the WHO-sponsored tour of 1987, he brought the boy back to New York to live with him. Unfortunately, Tachyon is a terrible father, and tends to spoil Blaise terribly or rage at him for acting improperly. Blaise rapidly grows up to be an arrogant and cruel bully who enjoys using his mind control powers to make people around him act like total fools. Eventually, Blaise goes "wild", running free on the streets of New York and brutally turning on his grandfather. He eventually becomes a complete sociopath who revels in the suffering of others, especially his grandfather. In later books, Blaise becomes the de facto leader of the Jumpers, acquiring their power in addition to his own, and returns to Takis in a bid to conquer the planet.

Bloat
Bloat is an adolescent boy transformed by the Wild Card virus into a powerful psychic with a monstrous Joker body. He was created by Stephen Leigh. Introduced in One-Eyed Jacks as Governor of the Roxm he comes to prominence and full awareness of his vast powers in Jokertown Shuffle. He is ostensibly the primary antagonist of that book, although his character is depicted as being well-intentioned and idealistic, but who is surrounded by less positive allies, and has few options. When last seen, it appears he manages to take the Rox into a safe parallel universe, avoiding the death of many of his followers.

Captain Trips
Captain Trips, also known as Dr. Mark Meadows, is a renowned biochemist and a burned-out hippie, with the ability to use various drugs (usually derivations of psychoactive drugs such as LSD) to transform into several other forms, each with their own powers and individual personalities. He was created by Victor Milán. Trips himself and several of his alternate forms would be considered Aces in the lexicon of the Wild Cards universe, though a few of his "friends" (as he terms them) could be classified as Jokers. It is theorized that, since all Meadow's "friends" and their powers are ultimately derived from Meadows himself, he is essentially the ultimate manifestation of the Wild Card virus.

Brain Trust
Brain Trust (Blythe Stanhope Van Renssaeler) was a member of the Four Aces, appearing in the stories "Degradation Rites" by Melinda M. Snodgrass (who created the character) and "Witness" by Walter Jon Williams.

Blythe was the wife of domineering New York Congressman Henry Van Renssaeler. When the Wild Card virus infected her, she gained the power to absorb an exact duplicate of another's mind, to know everything they knew. The first time she used this power was when she involuntarily absorbed her husband's mind. Suddenly she knew it all; his dirty politics and criminal activities, his affairs, and what he really thought about his wife.

Overwhelmed to the point of withdrawal, she was found and brought to Dr. Tachyon, in the hope that he could help her. He used his telepathy to help stabilize her mind, and the two soon began an affair. She was afraid to go back to Henry, and instead joined the organization that would become known as the Four Aces. Unlike Golden Boy and Black Eagle, Blythe, codenamed "Brain Trust", was a behind-the-scenes member at first. She was sent around the country to copy the minds of some of the world's greatest scientists, such as Albert Einstein, Jonas Salk, J. Robert Oppenheimer, and Wernher von Braun, so that there would be "back-up" copies of their knowledge. This made it even more difficult for her to maintain her mental balance; so, Tachyon began tutoring her in Takisian methods of mental control, when he wasn't romancing her.

The climate of the United States was growing harsher, and the Four Aces were called before the HUAC committee, who demanded to know the names of any Aces they had dealt with. When Golden Boy let slip that Brain Trust had also absorbed a copy of Tachyon's memories, which meant she knew all the Wild Carders Tachyon had treated, the Committee eagerly called her to the stand and began to browbeat and interrogate her. The fragile union of minds inside her made it difficult to resist, and she began to break down and name names. Tachyon, aghast, tried to telepathically force her silence, but only succeeded in shattering her remaining mental defenses, causing her to suffer a complete mental breakdown. Tachyon was deported, and Blythe was placed in a mental institution, where she eventually died of neglect.

After his pardon and return to America in the 1960s, Tachyon founded the Blythe van Renssaeler Memorial Hospital in the heart of New York's Jokertown, in honor of Brain Trust. More commonly known as the Jokertown Clinic, it has treated (if not necessarily cured) thousands of victims of the Wild Card virus. Fleur van Renssaeler, Blythe's daughter by her estranged husband, grew up to hate both the Wild Card virus and its creator, Dr. Tachyon. A supporter of anti-Wild-Card preacher Leo Barnett's bid for the presidency, Fleur once tried to seduce Tachyon in order to get information from him. During the brief encounter, Tachyon imagined himself with Blythe, while Fleur overcame her hatred of Tachyon by fantasizing about Leo Barnett. Blythe's granddaughter Dr. Clara van Renssaeler now works at the clinic.

Carnifex
Carnifex (William "Billy" Ray) was created by John J. Miller.

Carnifex (Latin for "butcher") is Billy Ray's nickname, which was given to him for his love of violence. Infection with the Wild Card virus has given him superhuman strength, speed, and stamina, along with a rapid regenerative healing factor and a heightened instinct for physical combat. His strength makes his fists like 10-pound sledge hammers, and his speed gives him a marked advantage over average opponents. In Wild Card terminology, this makes him an Ace.

Billy Ray was a college football star in the late 1970s, playing for the Michigan Wolverines. He was able to hide his Wild Card infection until he broke his leg in three places in the first quarter of the Rose Bowl (on national TV) and tried to return to the game before halftime.

He was recruited by the U.S. Justice Department, and has worked for them ever since, performing various missions such as protecting government officials and hunting down other Aces. He is highly aggressive and confrontational, and will fight at the slightest provocation. Despite his demeanor, he is obsessed with cleanliness, prefers his office absolutely neat, and hates getting bloodstains on his signature fighting suit, a form-fitting white jumpsuit with a black hood. He has several, as they generally get covered in blood, his and his opponents'.

As he has gotten older, his ability to regenerate has slowed, and he takes longer to heal between battles. Secretly he fears that someday he will stop healing altogether. His powers of regeneration were put to the ultimate test when he fought the Vibrating Joker/Ace Mackie Messer (aka Mack the Knife, real name: Detlev Mackintosh). He was shredded and torn in this battle, losing most of his jaw and several fingers, and took several months to fully heal. His regeneration is not perfect, as his body and face are a mass of scar tissue and obvious war wounds, and his features are slightly irregular from having his facial bones broken and reset so many times.

Chrysalis
Chrysalis was created by John J. Miller.

Chrysalis is the current owner/operator of the Crystal Palace, one of Jokertown's most well known nightclubs. She has blue eyes, almost totally transparent skin and muscle tissue, and no hair. She usually wears minimal amounts of clothing to emphasize this fact. She speaks with a convincing but false British accent. Chrysalis' primary occupation is the selling of information. She seems to know everything that happens in New York, and will buy and sell anything anyone wants to know for a price. She is one of the major players in Jokertown, although most of her work is done behind the scenes.

She had an intense affair with Yeoman. She was brutally murdered by Hiram Worchester (while he was under the influence of Ti Malice) in 1988.

Deadhead
Deadhead is an Ace, someone granted super-powers by exposure to the Wild Card virus; but the disturbing nature of his power has driven him nearly insane.

Deadhead has the ability to sense the memories of anyone whose brain he eats. He discovered this by accident; he began experiencing the sensations of animals whenever he ate meat, then worked his way up to animal brains. After several years he worked up the courage to try human brains, and found that he could completely—if temporarily—absorb all the knowledge and memories of the dead person.

At present, he works for the Shadow Fists, providing the gang with information in exchange for being kept out of prison or a mental ward. He is twitchy, has poor hygiene, constantly talks to himself in a nervous voice, and is always gulping down vitamins and appetite suppressants in a vain effort to reduce his craving for human brains.

Demise
Demise (James Spector) was created by Walton Simons, and first appeared in the story "If Looks Could Kill" in Wild Cards II: Aces High.
 
In 1985, Spector was struck by the Wild Card virus and brought to the Jokertown Clinic, where he was seen by Dr. Tachyon. Tachyon had been working on improving his "Trump Card" countervirus, which had a low success rate, and injected Spector with an experimental version of the Trump, as well as subjecting him to an experimental tissue-regeneration process. It was seemingly unsuccessful; Spector's body experienced the failure of numerous organs, and he was pronounced dead. However, shortly after, he awoke screaming and continued to scream for several months. Eventually, he got back enough of his sanity to escape (although he constantly feels the agony of his death), killing a nurse with his new-found power in the process.

In 1986, he was found by the cult leader known as The Astronomer, who offered to erase his unbearable memories of death if Spector would work for him. Giving Spector the name Demise, the Astronomer used Demise's death-powers in the ritual killings that charged the Astronomer's powers, and used Demise as an occasional assassin as well. When Demise eventually realised the Astronomer was just stringing him along, he rebelled; and when the Astronomer was weakened after his battle with Fortunato, Demise finished the old man off, leaving him embedded in a brick wall.

Afterwards, Demise became a freelance assassin while looking for opportunities to kill Tachyon, until he was hired to do a job at the 1988 Democratic National Convention. There, his head was cut off on live national television by the psychotic Ace Mack the Knife. Mackie used his vibrational powers to remove Demise's head – only for the severed head to open its eyes and kill Messer explosively. Later, Dr. Tachyon examined Demise's body in the morgue and saw that it was actually starting to grow a new head. Tachyon immediately ordered his body cremated, to ensure that he would not return from death a second time.

Demise's body repairs itself so perfectly that he can even return from death. He has healed himself from bullet wounds and broken bones in seconds, and regrown lost limbs and other body parts. However, his body draws from its own current mass to reconstruct major damage, such as the loss of a limb, thus weakening his overall health until he has sufficient time to recover. He is also at risk of long-term damage from improper healing; the Astronomer once had Demise's forearm broken and then forcibly held out of proper alignment so that the bones knit improperly, rendering the limb nonfunctional below the elbow.

Demise can also telepathically project the "memory" of his death experience into other people, causing them to die as well, but he must look them in the eyes to do so (thus he can be foiled by things such as mirrorshades or insectoid multiple eyes). He can kill in seconds, stretch it out slowly for a very painful death, or use just enough power to stun or disorient someone. His power also prevents someone from looking away once he has locked eyes with them.

Digger Downs
Thomas "Digger" Downs, created by Steve Perrin, is an investigative reporter for Aces magazine, a periodical on the lives of the Wild Cards universe's more publicly known Aces. Journalistically, Aces lies somewhere between People magazine and the National Enquirer, with Digger definitely toward the lower end of that scale. He constantly seeks to find juicy gossip about Aces, as well as Earth's only extra-terrestrial citizen, Dr. Tachyon, who despises Digger and, when confronted by him, often resorts to mind control to make Digger humiliate himself until he goes away. Most of their encounters end with Digger unwillingly pouring a drink over his own head, or something similar.

Digger's interest in Aces and their secrets seemingly stems from the fact that he is secretly an Ace himself; his power is the ability to detect the presence of other Wild Cards. Whether Aces or Jokers, anyone who has the alien virus entangled in their genes is perceived as having a sickly-sweet odor, which is how his brain interprets the input of what is essentially an extrasensory ability. While he is careful to always hide his ability, making vague statements about his "sources" when asked how he found someone out, he is not exactly discreet when it comes to revealing the Wild Card status of others.

In addition to his hidden Ace power, Digger is also skilled in sneaking, dumpster diving, long-range photography, party-crashing, and taking statements out of context. In other aspects of journalism, such as research and fact-checking, however, he is woefully lacking.

Dr. Tachyon
Dr. Tachyon is a geneticist from the planet Takis, whose people naturally developed various telepathic powers. Interbreeding among these psionic peoples created a royal caste system with various specified powers. Tachyon's royal House Ilkazam created what human doctors called "Xenovirus Takis-A"—the Wild Card virus. The virus (known to the Takisians as "the Enhancer") was intended to boost their own natural psionic powers, allowing Tachyon's house to conquer their rivals. To avoid the side-effects, it was decided to test the virus on an isolated population with the same DNA as Takisians – the humans of Earth. Tachyon protested this decision. He then tried to stop his partners from testing the virus on Earth, without success. Since he had personally been responsible for getting the virus to its present testable stage, when the virus was released, he worked among the "Jokers", physically deformed and mutated victims of the virus, feeling responsible for their suffering. Of course, Tachyon was not so anguished that he refrained from hobnobbing with celebrities, politicians, and many "Aces", those rare humans successfully granted paranormal abilities by the Enhancer. His nickname came from the scientists who worked with him and is a reference to the tachyon particles used by his ship's faster than light drive - his own name was prohibitively long, and hard to pronounce. His normal telepathic powers include skilled mind reading, thought projection, and the ability to physically control up to three human bodies, while simultaneously reading their minds and projecting his own thoughts to them. These powers can be reduced by extreme physical, emotional, or psychological stress.

Soon after his arrival on Earth, Tachyon became romantically involved with Blythe Van Renssaeler, the estranged wife of an anti-Wild Card senator. Under the codename Brain Trust, Blythe was a member of the short-lived Wild Card "team", the Four Aces. Rounded up during the Red Ace scare of the 1950s (analogous to the real-life Red Scare of the time period in American history). Tachyon, the Four Aces, and their government sponsor were brought before the House Committee on Un-American Activities (HUAC). When Brain Trust was put on the stand, Tachyon telepathically mind-controlled his lover and accidentally drove Blythe insane, in order to prevent her from revealing information she had absorbed from him—information such as the names and powers of many Aces he had treated over the years. Blythe was committed to an insane asylum where she eventually died. Due to his own failure to comply with HUAC, Tachyon was deported from the United States, winding up a drunken derelict wandering through Europe, psychologically unable to use his mind-control abilities due to his shame over what he had done to Brain Trust. It was during his time in France that he fathered Giselle Baucort, the mother of Blaise Andrieux. It is unknown if Giselle inherited any of Tachyon's telepathic abilities, but his grandson Blaise possessed prodigious, though one-sided, mind-control abilities, which would later be used against Tachyon to devastating effect.

Years later, after a pardon from President John F. Kennedy, Tachyon returned to America, sobered up somewhat, regained his powers, and started a clinic in Jokertown, all with the help of The Great and Powerful Turtle. He even applied for and was granted American citizenship. Closely tied to the Joker/Ace community, Tachyon has been at the center of many important events in Wild Card history. He developed the Trump virus, a potential, but unstable cure for the Wild Card that works only part of the time, and sometimes kills. He participated in the raid on the Egyptian Freemason headquarters and survived an attack on the Aces High restaurant by the Freemasons' leader, a deranged Ace called the Astronomer. With the help of Capt. Trips, Tachyon deflected an asteroid sent hurtling toward Earth by rogue Takisians led by his cousin Zabb. Assisted by the human vigilante Yeoman and the Ace "sorcerer" Fortunato, Tachyon helped drive off a race of sentient parasites known as the Swarm. While in France as part of a World Health Organization world tour to assess the condition of Wild Card survivors in various countries, Tachyon discovered the existence of his grandson, Blaise. Smuggling Blaise back into America with the help of forged documents, Tachyon became a single parent. Some of the Takisian attitudes he sought to instill in his new heir would have disastrous repercussions. His right hand was cut off by the psychotic Ace Mackie Messer at the disastrous 1988 Democratic National Convention in Atlanta. Tachyon orchestrated the capture of Typhoid Croyd (an Ace whose power created a brief, but wildly contagious outbreak of communicable Wild Card virus), which resulted in his being infected with a latent form of the virus. He patrolled the streets of Jokertown with a small private army of Jokers during a protracted war between the Mafia and an alliance of Asian mobs and Joker street gangs called the Shadow Fists. Finally, during the subsequent raids carried out on New York by the Shadow Fists' "Jumpers" – vicious teenagers with body-snatching powers – an unlikely series of events led to Tachyon's departure from Earth and ultimate return to Takis.

Considered effeminate and thought by some, such as Fortunato, to be gay because of his flamboyant ways, Tachyon was actually a notorious womanizer. Aside from numerous unnamed groupies and other one night stands, Tachyon's list of conquests includes Brain Trust, Danelle Darcy, Roulette, and Fleur van Rensselaer (Brain Trust's daughter). Perhaps more significant is the list of women Tachyon has not bedded, either due to a brief bout with sexual impotence (Fantasy and Mistral) or bad timing (Water Lily and Peregrine). Two unrequited loves in particular were Angelface and Dr. Cody Havero. Angelface was a beautiful Joker whose manifestation of the Wild Card disease made her bruise or bleed at the slightest touch. Tachyon pined for her during the booze-soaked period between his return to America and the establishment of the Jokertown Clinic. Cody Havero is a more recent love interest. Coming into Tachyon's life around the time of the Jumper scare, Cody refuses to sleep with the Takisian until he devotes himself to her exclusively. Later, following a Jumper attack, Tachyon's new body and condition would prevent him from consummating his relationship with Cody before leaving the planet. While on Takis, Tachyon in his female body took as his lover his flamboyant cousin Zabb. Though both of them did care for one another, their personal agendas kept them from commitment. During the fight to apprehend Blaise and recapture Tachyon's male body, Zabb was killed in a fight with Blaise. Tachyon mourned his loss. The infant they created between them was named Zabb in honor of the man who'd given his life trying to follow Tachyon's wishes.

It was during the Jumpers' reign of terror in the early 1990s that the sociopathic nature of Tachyon's grandson became fully evident. After trying to rape Dr. Havero, and a failed murder attempt on Tachyon himself, Blaise ran away from home. The boy was only fifteen at the time. Recruited by the Jumpers and initiated into their gang, Blaise quickly became their leader. Using his newfound body-swapping powers, Blaise performed a bizarre triple-jump that left Tachyon trapped in the body of Kelly Jenkins, a sixteen-year-old girl, and vice versa. Now female, Tachyon was kept as her grandson's prisoner and virtual slave for several months. Worse, trapped in a nat body, Tachyon lacked any defense against Blaise's powerful mind control. After multiple rapes and beatings, Tachyon became impregnated with her own great-granddaughter – much to the amusement of Blaise and those Jokers who resented Tachyon as the author of their misery. Using her psi-lord training to access the telepathic powers her unborn child inherited from Blaise, Tachyon achieves low level telepathy. Captured while attempting to escape, she employs crude mental shields (similar to those she constructed for Brain Trust years ago) to rebuff Blaise's psychic attack. Her grandson retaliates by assaulting her one last time. Somewhere in her second trimester, Tachyon escapes captivity, but not her current body or condition, with the help of ace vigilante Black Shadow and the Joker revolutionary called Bloat.

Shortly after the first Battle of the Rox, Tachyon returned to the contested island with the help of the Great and Powerful Turtle. Bloat was unable to grant Tachyon's request to have Blaise and her original body returned to her. Amid the chaos of the National Guard attack, Blaise escaped the Rox, taking Kelly with him. Bloat could only offer the mental image of a seashell (glimpsed when Blaise's mind shields slipped during the attack) as a clue to her grandson's location. Bloat had interpreted a vision of Tachyon's organic spaceship as a seashell. Realizing Blaise meant to steal her ship in order to escape Earth, Tachyon and the Turtle immediately set off to stop him. Bloat would never see Tachyon again.

Decades before, Tachyon had traveled from Takis to Earth in a living starship with its own mind... the mind of a child. He even named it "Baby", and its personality had grown somewhat addled after years of imprisonment in a government facility. Still absolutely dedicated to its master, Baby was eventually released back to Tachyon. By having Kelly Jenkins pose as Tachyon, Blaise used that loyalty to hijack Baby. Though possessed of prodigious telekinetic powers, Turtle was unable to stop Tachyon's stolen ship from engaging its "ghost-drive". Fleeing to Takis, Blaise left Tachyon without any apparent means of pursuing him. It seemed Tachyon was permanently trapped not only upon Earth, but in the body of a pregnant teenage girl.
 
This period between Tachyon's escape from the Rox and her return to Takis is arguably the lowest point in the alien's life. No triumphant welcome awaited her return to New York. With Tachyon presumed dead, Dr. Bradley Finn was made acting director of the Jokertown Clinic and her apartment had been rented out to new tenants. Given the run of Finn's apartment until more permanent arrangements could be made, Tachyon becomes highly agitated when the Joker suggests her jump might now be permanent and that she should come to terms with it. Worse, Tachyon's love interest, Dr. Cody Havero, is somewhat unsypathetic to the alien's plight, reminding the former womanizer of his rather insensitive treatment of other women. Suffering from a panic attack, Tachyon is administered a light sedative by Dr. Havero despite the older woman's concerns about the advanced state of Tachyon's pregnancy. Expressing a desire to be alone, Finn and Cody leave Tachyon by herself, ostensibly to get some sleep.

Awakened by a nightmare, Tachyon succumbs to the psychological part of her addiction to alcohol (Kelly having already inherited and given in to the physical half that went with Tachyon's male body). Drinking a substantial amount of Finn's brandy, the already depressed alien is further unbalanced by the combined sedative and alcohol. While using the bathroom she is confronted by her new reflection. As described in one story: "After relieving herself she stood and stared at her thickening body: I've become a joker. A stranger in a deformed body. Lifting the hem of the long T-shirt, Tach ran an experimental hand across her swollen belly".

A lifetime of Takisian abhorrence of the ugly and deformed reinforces Tachyon's distorted perception of her pregnant form. Having long ago stated an inability to ever live as a Joker, Tachyon slits her wrists while taking a bath. In the past, Tachyon often threatened to kill himself with more melodrama than seriousness. His abuse of alcohol could also be seen as a manifestation of an urge toward self-destruction. However, this is the only time Tachyon has attempted outright suicide, likely prompted by the radical alteration of his/her self-image caused by the jump, Blaise's sexual assault, her subsequent pregnancy, and the reactions of others to her upon returning to public life. Tachyon would later remark to Mark Meadows that she needed psychological therapy in order to regain her sense of self.

Awakened from unconsciousness by another disturbing dream, this one possibly inspired by her unborn child's psychic distress calls, Tachyon manages to crawl from the bathtub and telephone Cody. Weak from blood loss, she collapses on Finn's bed. Cody arrives and administers an emergency blood transfusion. They talk and Cody encourages Tachyon to seek rape crisis counseling. Also the question of Tachyon's attraction to Cody comes up and the body-swapped alien replies that, aside from pregnancy reducing her famous sex-drive, "those troublesome hormones" generated by her new body (estrogen and progesterone, specifically) have failed to elicit any sexual response. Cody spends the night, but cannot resist commenting, "It's not quite how I envisioned my first time in your bed". Tachyon recovers both physically and mentally, now ready to pursue Blaise and reclaim her true form at any cost.

Contacting a representative of the Network (a spacefaring culture reviled by the Takisians), Tachyon booked passage on a Network ship and returned to her homeworld, where Blaise was busily fomenting a catastrophic war between Houses. Accompanied by the Aces Captain Trips and Popinjay, Tachyon's bid to reclaim the throne to which she is heir (a position traditionally reserved for the male members of her House) ends in disaster. Representing the genetic wealth of the Great Houses, Takisian women of childbearing years are relegated to Raranna, (the traditional Takisian harem in which women are kept secluded from the public eye and enemy assassins). Though the telepathic Takisians knew her mind was male, it was determined that Tachyon's thoughts would naturally be more focused upon the looming birth of her child. Military strategy and political machinations were better left in the hands of her avaricious cousin, Zabb.

Placed in protective custody with House Ilkazam's other breeding females, including the biological sisters of her male form, Tachyon refused to continue research on the Enhancer (as Takisians called the Wild Card), but readily employed Kelly's two good hands to practice surgery once more. Nearly delivered back into Blaise's hands by a quirk of Takisian law classifying a pregnant woman as property of her child's father, Tachyon earns the enmity of many influential nobles by trying to stab Blaise while under a flag of truce. Eventually, Tachyon escapes Raranna, defeats Blaise, and recovers her male body, though not before enduring childbirth, seeing the very foundations of Takisian society ripped apart in a bloody civil war, and fending off an attack by Network "carpetbaggers".

Tachyon currently remains on Takis, raising his physical daughter/genetic granddaughter, serving as leader of his House, and trying to rebuild a Takisian society that has already been shaken to its foundations. Many of the old-style Takisian nobles were slain during Blaise's World War, and replaced by avaricious young cadets. In one of his speeches Blaise promised the mindblind Tarhiji life-extending serums that do not exist. Only a handful of noblewomen were left alive following the massacre of House Rodaleh at Blaise's hands, resulting in the near total loss of a line of powerful psi-healers. Raiyis Hazzal of House Jeban remarked that this would lead to more widespread cases of insanity. Among Tachyon's plans for the future are the dissolution of Raranna, where he was confined while carrying Kelly's child, and a program to interbreed the psychic and "mind-blind" segments of the populace, thus creating a truly telepathic race better capable of fending off the Network. What effect these plans will have on the already unstable state of Takisian world affairs remains to be seen.

Tachyon is very emotional, self-centered, prone to openly weeping, and a spoiled, womanizing aristocrat who indulges himself in every way. During the course of the Wild Cards series, he matures a great deal. Tachyon always dresses flamboyantly, in what are, by Earthly standards, antiquated clothes of glaringly clashing colors (by Takisian standards, he's considered quite suave). After Messer's attack, his right hand is a prosthetic replacement, though he has considered having a new hand regrown while staying on Takis. Due to Blaise's political machinations while Kelly was occupying Tachyon's body, he is technically married to Mona'ella, the royal princess of a rival House, though the legality/permanence of this arrangement is currently unknown.

Envoy
The Envoy (David Harstein) is a member of The Four Aces, first appearing in the story "Witness" by Walter Jon Williams in the first book of the series, Wild Cards.

David Harstien is an Ace, one of those gifted with amazing powers by the Wild Card virus. He emits pheromones which make anyone feel like he is their best friend, causing whoever is near him to become completely agreeable—as long as he's in the same room. The effects quickly wear off, however, leaving his victims fully aware of their often uncharacteristic actions.

In 1946, he became a behind-the-scenes member of the Exotics for Democracy, who would later become publicly known as the Four Aces. The group enjoyed some public success in capturing Nazi war criminals. Behind the scenes, Envoy was secretly attending international summits and making everyone get along just long enough to sign peace treaties; but once his power wore off, many nations reneged on their agreements. This caused the Four Aces to come to the unfortunate attention of HUAC, the House Un-American Activities Committee, who were looking for scapegoats.

At first, when he was put on the stand, Harstein merely bided his time, waiting for his pheromones to permeate the enormous room. After his powers began to take effect, even the most prejudiced committee member was referring to Harstein as "America's little Hebe friend". But, again, once the air was cleared the committee's hostility returned, and David was called back to testify in a sealed booth, rendering his ability useless. He was found guilty of contempt of Congress and jailed.

After his release, David Harstein disappeared. It is rumored that he went to Israel for several years. He later returned to America under an assumed name and started a moderately successful career as a stage actor named Josh Davidson.

Father Squid
Father Squid is a priest, created by John J. Miller.

Father Squid is a Joker, the common term for a person deformed by the alien Wild Card virus. He has a mass of small tentacles hanging where his nose would be, slick hairless grey skin, extra-long fingers with a pattern of suckers on them, and he smells like seawater. His build is twice as broad as a normal man's and he is proportionately stronger, and can hold his breath nearly half an hour.

The man known today as Father Squid has never revealed his real name, nor is it known if he was born with his current appearance or contracted the Wild Card virus sometime early in his life. What is known is that during the Vietnam War, the man then called "Squidface" was a member of the Joker's Brigade, a unit of "selectively conscripted" Jokers sent into the most dangerous situations, while being retained far longer than a normal tour of duty. This was believed to be a deliberate attempt by the U.S. government to "thin out" the Joker population while getting some use out of them, a fact the Brigade members cynically acknowledged. Those who survived more than a short while became very skilled fighters, indeed. It was here that Squid met and befriended Captain Daniel Brennan, who did not share the common prejudice against Jokers.

It has been rumored that, after the war, Squidface became a member of the Joker terrorist group called the Twisted Fists, and was responsible for numerous attacks on "Nats" (naturals, a derogatory term for those without Wild Card mutations). He refuses to talk about his past, so the details are unknown. At some point, he experienced a change of heart, choosing to put his violent past behind him.

By the time of his first appearance in the Wild Cards books, he is the only priest of the Church of Jesus Christ, Joker, a religion specifically for Jokers, located in New York's Jokertown (the first and largest Joker community in the world). The Church is a bizarre blend of Catholic traditions, Wild Card history, and ideas taken from medical science, and emphasizes the suffering and persecution that Jokers have undergone and are still undergoing. The symbol of the church is a radically deformed Joker Jesus, crucified on a DNA strand. Dr. Tachyon, the creator of the virus, but also a supporter and caregiver of Jokertown, is portrayed in Church art as similar to the Roman deity Janus, as having two heads or faces, one angelic and one demonic. It is unclear if Father Squid founded the church or simply joined it, but he is certainly the heart and soul of the Jokertown congregation. The Church is the center of Jokertown society, even for those who do not follow its faith; almost all Joker funerals are held there, for instance.Quasiman is the part-time caretaker and sometime protector of the church.

In the novel Card Sharks, the church is burned down by an arsonist. The subsequent investigation is what leads to the eventual uncovering of the Card Sharks conspiracy to create the Black Trump, an anti-Joker virus.

Father Squid was murdered by Baba Yaga, an Ace whose saliva fatally transformed victims into horribly twisted, furniture-like forms, in the novel Lowball. True to his later life, Father Squid died saving another person from Baba Yaga.

Fortunato
Fortunato was created by Lewis Shiner. He is a pimp, but prefers to downplay, even to himself, the negative aspects of his escort business. Fortunato is also an Ace. His Wild Card virus grants him immense telepathic and telekinetic powers. These include but are not limited to: mind control, flight, force walls, mental blasts, reading the future (and the past), and subjective temporal manipulation. Dr. Tachyon believes him to be Earth's most powerful mental/telepathic Wild Card. Fortunato derives all his power from tantric sex magic. Tantric rituals feed his power reserve, which then allow him to utilize his massive powers. However, the more he uses them, the faster he runs out of power. In terms of power and strength, Fortunato is even (or nearly even) with the Astronomer; this is one of the most obvious case of opposites in the Wild Cards' universe (Fortunato gaining his power from sex—the source of life—while The Astronomer gains his powers from death).

Fortunato was an infant of unspecified age on the first Wild Card day. Son of an unnamed African-American soldier and his wife Ichiko, a Japanese woman his father brought back to New York after WWII, Fortunato was infected by the initial wave of virus-carrying spores released into the upper atmosphere during Jetboy's battle with Dr. Tod. Fortunato became a latent carrier of the virus that would not "turn his card" until many years later. His father was not so lucky, dying after drawing the Black Queen. Raised by his mother, Fortunato was subjected to various forms of discrimination, due to his mixed parentage, and grew into a handsome, but angry, young man. Graduating from petty crime to pimping, Fortunato brought home the first girl in his stable at age sixteen.

In the '70s, Fortunato was introduced to tantric sex magic while "auditioning" a new girl. The intense orgasm brought on by the sex ritual triggered his latent Wild Card, causing him to have an out-of-body experience. Disheartened to learn that Fortunato's sudden powers were the result of a virus rather than true magic, Fortunato's new girl left the city. Undeterred, Fortunato continued to pursue research into tantric rituals as a means for further developing his mental abilities. He, however, was not prompted solely by curiosity. A serial killer had been preying upon New York prostitutes, including his own, and Fortunato wanted revenge. Still in the early stages of developing his power, the Ace pimp brought a handgun as backup. Forced to kill in self defense, instead of the righteous revenge he had planned, Fortunato was unable to question the murderer. Disgusted, but seemingly unable to stop himself, he performed a tantric ritual upon the dead man's corpse, briefly bringing it back to life. Though never explicitly stated, guilt brought on by this experience could be the reason Fortunato consistently accused Dr. Tachyon of being a "faggot from outer space". Only temporarily revitalized, the corpse uttered the word "Tiamat" and then tore its own throat out. This, along with a strange red penny carried by the killer, served as Fortunato's only clue in a mystery that would eventually bring him into conflict with the deadly Astronomer.

Even before turning his Wild Card, Fortunato was a tall, muscular individual with intense sex appeal. Inheriting the best features of both parents, Fortunato was a handsome man of African-American and Japanese descent with pronounced epicanthic folds around his eyes. After becoming an Ace, Fortunato literally radiated sexual magnetism, even though the virus had physically manifested as a somewhat distended forehead, as outward evidence of his prodigious mental powers. When using his powers to their fullest, a pair of quasi-real, curving horns will often appear, extending outward from his enlarged forehead.

Golden Boy
Golden Boy (Jack Braun) is a member of the Four Aces, created by Walter Jon Williams.

In the series, he is regarded as possibly the strongest man in the world, with the exception of Harlem Hammer. His force field, which has a golden glow when active, grants him immunity from virtually anything strictly physical. He is especially resistant to physical impacts, such as bullets and fists. Over the years, Golden Boy has developed a fear of heights, which came about after being told that a long fall could be one of the things that could kill him. However, he can be subject to telepathic attacks and may be vulnerable to gaseous attacks, such as inhaled nerve gas. If he is suddenly and unexpectedly struck with an object, such as a bullet, his aura automatically engages.

Jack Braun was born in rural North Dakota in 1924. As a youth he was impressed by the agrarian radicalism of the local farmers, including his family, and by the New Deal liberalism of FDR, as embodied in Agriculture undersecretary Archibald Holmes. He served on the Italian front during WWII and afterwards moved to New York with the hopes of pursuing an acting career. When the Wild Card virus struck Manhattan, he discovered that he had superhuman strength and a forcefield that protected him from harm. In the aftermath of the virus outbreak, he met Archibald Holmes who was directing relief efforts. Holmes recruited Braun, along with fellow veteran and Ace Earl Sanderson Jr. (Black Eagle), into a new super team. The group was officially known as the "Exotics for Democracy", but after the addition of Aces David Harstein (Envoy) and Blythe van Renssaeler (Brain Trust), they became popularly known as the "Four Aces". Holmes used the Four Aces to advance his liberal internationalist vision of the world. In the late 1940s, they fought fascism around the world. The quartet tracked down Nazi war criminals and overthrew the regime of Juan Peron in Argentina. Braun's physical powers and good looks quickly turned him into a media celebrity. He quickly received a contract from Warner Brother's Studio and starred in a fictional version of his exploits with the Four Aces.

Things soon changed as the Exotics for Democracy came under scrutiny from the House Un-American Activities Committee. The committee was investigating Aces whom they saw as an insidious force undermining America. The fact that Braun's partner in the Four Aces, Earl Sanderson Jr., had once been a member of the Communist Party, and continued to be a fellow traveler, aroused particular interest, as did the fact that Earl was black. When an attempt by the Four Aces to prop up the Nationalist regime in China failed, the Committee subpoenaed all of them. Braun, naively believing that since they had not committed any crimes they had nothing to fear, bowed to pressure from the studio and his wife and became a cooperating witness. In his testimony, he tried to limit the damage he did to his friends, explaining that Earl Sanderson had abandoned the Communist Party years before and indicating that he, Braun, knew nothing about the politics of any other Aces. He however accidentally let slip that his teammate Blythe van Renssaeler had absorbed the mind of team advisor Dr. Tachyon and thus would know of any Aces which Tachyon, an uncooperative witness, would know of. When van Renssaeler appeared before the committee, she suffered a nervous breakdown—brought on by the telepathic meddling of Dr. Tachyon—and was institutionalized for the rest of her life.

In the wake of the committee hearings, the Four Aces broke up—as van Renssaeler was institutionalized, Holmes and Harstein were imprisoned, and Sanderson and Tachyon fled the country. Braun survived any legal repercussions but faced condemnation from history and the Wild Card community over his cooperation, and he felt guilty the rest of his life. After the hearings, his movie career failed to take off. He starred in a hit movie based on the life of Eddie Rickenbacker, but the movie based on his own life failed, and other attempts at stardom failed. Braun blamed his committee testimony for his poor box office performance, insisting that no one wanted to see "a rat" as a hero. Later, he had several years of moderate success with a television series based on Tarzan. Braun fought in the Korean War and after retiring from acting went into real estate. Sometime in the 1960s, he realized that he did not age. In 1988, Braun served as a delegate to the Democratic National Convention and almost died when the Ace Demise tried to kill him. Braun's last public appearance was in 2007 when he served as a judge on the reality television show American Hero.

Great and Powerful Turtle
Known colloquially as Turtle or The Turtle, his real name is Thomas Tudbury. Born in Bayonne, New Jersey in 1945, he exhibited his telekinetic powers during adolescence, thinking that his pet turtles had the ability to fly unsupported through their own means. Tudbury dropped out of college his freshman year in the wake of the John F. Kennedy assassination. Returning home, Tudbury contemplated his options in life and considered becoming a superhero. However, his shyness and need for intense focus prevented him from using his telekinetic ability in public. A friend of Tudbury's suggested that he outfit an old Volkswagen Beetle with discarded battleship armor, television cameras, and monitors, and use it as a shell. This became the first of many "shells" used by The Turtle. Usually built around the chassis of old cars, they had armor to protect Tudbury as well as cameras and loudspeakers to allow him to interact with the world. One of Tudbury's early adventures brought him into contact with Dr. Tachyon, who at the time was an alcoholic recluse. Tudbury helped him attain semi-sobriety, thereby establishing a rocky friendship that would persist for thirty years. Turtle became one of the most famous and also most mysterious Aces in the world. Among the few straightforward superheroes in the Wild Card series, The Turtle's identity was the subject of much speculation, with many believing that he was a Joker who hid his deformity in his "shell". In reality, out of his shell, Turtle is of medium height with a slight beer belly, short brown hair, and glasses. For many years, Turtle's secret civilian identity was that of a simple TV repairman and proprietor of an electronics store. In light of his day job and the sedentary manner of his "patrolling the streets" as the Turtle, Tudbury is something of a TV junkie and couch potato. Eventually Tudbury faked his own death for insurance purposes and devoted himself full time to super heroics. After his near death by drowning, Tommy was plagued by nightmares and is still has trouble sleeping.

One of the many Aces recruited to combat the Swarm invasion of Earth during the 1980s, Turtle is also among a handful of Aces captured by a Takisian starship around the same time. Sent to investigate the results of their genetic tampering with the human race, and believing Earth to be doomed by the Swarm's arrival, the Takisians captured Turtle, Fantasy, Capt. Trips, and their prodigal prince Dr. Tachyon, intending to return them to the planet Takis. In a rare instance of overcoming the psychological block of employing his powers outside of his shell, Turtle captures an alien artifact with his telekinetic powers and, activated by Dr. Tachyon's telepathy, the captives teleport back to Earth.

Later, due to his involvement in an attack on the Egyptian Freemasons' stronghold, Turtle is marked for execution by the cult's leader, a deranged but incredibly powerful Ace called the Astronomer. While floating over the East River, Turtle is ambushed by Imp and Insulin, two of the Astronomer's followers. Imp's electromagnetic powers disable the sensors and cameras of Turtle's shell, and Insulin's power to alter blood sugar levels disorients Turtle, with an effect akin to a sudden, massive attack of diabetes. Plunging into the river, Turtle assumes he is freed by some freak nature of water pressure causing his sinking shell to burst apart. He has time for one showy flight over New York City in an older shell, done to dispel the rumors of his death, before his powers begin to mysteriously desert him.

Believing his powers have permanently faded, Turtle attempts to build a normal life for himself, but to no avail. A budding romance with a girl from his school days is crushed when he learns she turned her own Wild Card at age eight and was cured by a dose of the trump virus. Dr. Tachyon warns Turtle that the trump virus was never administered, leaving the potentially deadly Wild Card virus still latent in her system. Any children they conceive will inherit the Wild Card and likely die in childbirth or manifest as Jokers. Turtle, knowing his fiancée wants children, reluctantly breaks off their relationship—unable or unwilling to explain their genetic incompatibility.

Turtle's powers return with the realization that it was his own telekinesis that destroyed the sinking shell in a desperate bid to save his life. Selling three of his older shells to Charles Dutton, owner of the Famous Bowery Wild Card Dime Museum, Turtle is financially prepared for the next phase of his life. With the city under martial law in the wake of a new Wild Card outbreak that affects even those who have already been infected, Turtle must escape New York with his money, on foot. During this trek, Tudbury briefly befriends the hideous Mish-Mash but flees, when the Joker attempts to kill a police officer. Enlisting the help of Dr. Tachyon, Turtle fakes his death as one of the many victims of this second Wild Card outbreak caused by Typhoid Croyd. Shortly thereafter, he returns to active status as the Great and Powerful Turtle, complete with a newly designed and constructed high-tech shell.

In the early 1990s, the Turtle makes two separate visits to the Rox, a street name for Ellis Island, which had become a stronghold for Joker criminals, rogue Aces, and a gang of body-swapping teenagers known as Jumpers. Recently escaped from the Rox after months of imprisonment, Dr. Tachyon—having "jumped" into a runaway teenage girl who is several months pregnant—flees to Turtle's junkyard hideout. After some initial disbelief from Turtle, Tachyon establishes her (his) identity and enlists Turtle's help. Returning to the Rox, intent upon recovering Dr. Tachyon's true self, Turtle and the doctor arrive in the wake of the disastrous first Battle of the Rox. Initially repelled by Bloat's Wall, Turtle deduces the psychic barrier around the Rox can not extend upward indefinitely and flies over it. Witnessing the torture and execution of some National Guard soldiers, Turtle uses his telekinetic power to protect those left alive and threatens to crush the victorious Jokers "like ants" if they do not cease and desist. The Jokers comply.

Too late to capture Blaise and Kelly (the girl whose body is now occupied by Tachyon), Turtle flies at top speed to the warehouse containing the doctor's spaceship. Smashing the warehouse roof open, the organic starship attempts to escape, and Turtle briefly manages to halt its progress through a prodigious exertion of his powers—telekinetically seizing it in the air. The ship's engines are too strong, effectively towing Turtle's shell behind it, and the jump to faster-than-light speed shortly thereafter breaks his control, sending his shell tumbling back to Earth. Limping home, Turtle drops Tachyon off on the roof of the Jokertown clinic. Later, recruited by Tachyon to accompany her to Takis, alongside Capt. Trips, Turtle is forced to remain behind when the Network ship that will take them off-planet proves too small to accommodate his shell. Deprived of his shell, Turtle's usefulness is limited by being able to levitate only small objects, such as pencils and rocks. He is replaced at the last minute on the trip by Ace private eye Jay Ackroyd.

Left behind on Earth, Turtle agrees to participate in the second government assault on the Rox, which has now been declared a Joker homeland and has officially seceded from the United States. The largest team of Aces ever assembled is sent, backed up by the U.S. Army, to quell the Joker rebellion once and for all. The inhabitants of the Rox—not without powers of their own—defend their claim to Ellis Island, and the single largest instance of all-out Wild Card combat erupts. In defeating Dylan Hardesty (The Huntsman), Turtle is responsible for the destruction of the Brooklyn Bridge. When his current lover, Legion, was apparently murdered in front of him by someone on the Rox, Tudbury became enraged and used his powers to send a tidal wave down the East River, apparently destroying the Rox and everyone on it. In the wake of this, Tudbury retired as The Turtle and has since gone public with his identity and published his memoirs, only briefly reappearing to help another Ace, Zoe Harris, better learn how to control her powers.

Tudbury is the most powerful telekinetic on Earth. The upper limits of his powers are unknown, but some of his notable feats include lifting a battleship out of the water for several minutes, temporarily halting a Takisian starship in mid-flight, ripping off the leg of the second robotic Modular Man, destroying the Brooklyn Bridge, and creating a tidal wave to drown inhabitants of the Rox. However, Tudbury is also incredibly insecure about his powers, which causes them to wilt to almost nothing when he is not in a "shell". Outside his shell, Turtle's telekinesis is limited to levitating small objects, such as pencils and beer cans—or, when in a calm, confident state—objects about the size and weight of a bowling ball, including an alien teleportation device and the first Modular Man's severed head. In or out of his shell, Turtle tends to best employ his powers through acts of visualization—where he imagines giant, invisible hands, fists, shields, battering rams, wings, and other "props" he can focus on. Once, when flying three shells simultaneously, Turtle found it easier to imagine all three welded to the points of a giant triangle rather than trying to levitate them separately.

During his career as an Ace, The Turtle employs a variety of shells, typically one right after another—the newer, more high-tech models replacing their older, outmoded counterparts. Occasionally, most often upon the loss or destruction of his latest shell, Turtle must fall back upon an earlier model until a new one can be constructed, usually assisted by his childhood friend Joey, an accomplished mechanic.

Thomas Tudbury owns a dog named after one of his personal heroes and favorite comic-book characters, Jetboy. Jetboy the dog is a big, black labrador–doberman mix, freely roaming Turtle's junkyard lair. Jetboy once gave Dr. Tachyon—who was female and pregnant at the time, thanks to the Jumpers—some trouble reaching Tommy's front door.

Harlem Hammer
The Harlem Hammer (Mordecai Albert Jones) was created by Victor Milán and appeared in the fourth book in the series, Aces Abroad.

Mordecai Jones was driving a bulldozer at a construction site when he accidentally ruptured a container of illegally buried nuclear waste. The exposure would have killed him were it not for the fact that his dormant Wild Card virus activated under the stress of the moment, turning him into an Ace. His body integrated the toxic radioactive isotopes, increasing his mass and density, and replacing most of the calcium in his bones with heavy metals and bone-seekers such as strontium.

Mordecai Jones is the second strongest Ace in the Wild Cards universe, just below Golden Boy. He has a metabolism that is now dependent on radioactive isotopes and heavy metal salts, which he must obtain illegally. His normal body temperature is 106 degrees Fahrenheit, he needs little sleep, he must eat far more than normal, and his weight is four times that of a normal man his size. His increased mass and density give him superhuman strength and durability. He is immune to disease and heals far faster than normal.

Jones was hospitalized, studied, and kept a prisoner by overzealous health officials until he simply broke down a wall and walked out. He had to remain in hiding until the ACLU, Dr. Tachyon, and SCARE (the Senate Committee on Ace Resources and Endeavors) declared him legally free. The press nicknamed him the Harlem Hammer, but he is a reluctant hero at best. After accidentally dislocating his daughter's shoulder with his super-strength, he realized that he could no longer stay with his family and moved to New York to become an auto mechanic. Harlem Hammer was one of the prominent public Aces chosen by the World Health Organization to join their world inspection tour of Wild Card conditions around the world.

Hiram Worchester
Hiram Worchester was created by George R. R. Martin. His first appearance was a brief cameo in "Wild Card Chic", a short in-story document in the first book of the series, Wild Cards. Hiram is an Ace, one of the fortunate few gifted with amazing abilities by the Wild Card virus. He can manipulate gravity, which he uses to render his 375-pound frame a mere 35 pounds, making him incredibly agile for his size. Customarily, to affect others with his power, he raises his forearm and curls his hand into a fist as a focus for his concentration. A theme in the Wild Cards setting is that of empowered individuals unconsciously placing limits or conditions on their abilities, though in Jokers Wild Hiram appears somewhat aware that his hand motion is nothing more than a focusing technique.

Though he is described as having had a brief career as a superhero named "Fatman" prior to his first appearance, Hiram quickly gave it up (the GURPS Wild Cards sourcebook contains the telling line "...as a crimefighter he is an excellent cook") to return to his first love, the gourmet restaurant business. He opens Aces High, located in the Empire State Building, which does booming business as Nat tourists flock there in hopes of seeing Ace celebrities. A number of both major and minor Aces also hang out there, basking in the glory. Aces High is also the location of the traditional Wild Card Day dinner, with all Aces invited free of charge (they must provide proof of an Ace ability). This is the source of some controversy in the Wild Cards universe, as it is seen to be elitist that only Aces, and not Jokers, are given this treatment.

Hiram later saves the life of Water Lily when she is flung off a balcony by the Astronomer, and develops a crush on her. During the Aces Abroad world tour, he falls victim to the parasitic Ti Malice, and Lily ends up as a "mount" of the evil Joker as well. The strain of being Ti Malice's mount eventually takes its toll on Hiram. His absences from work became greater and greater, alienating his chefs and maitre d'. While in Japan he ran afoul of a Yakuza Ace and required Fortunato's help to escape the country alive. When he learns Chrysalis has arranged to have a presidential candidate assassinated, the stressed-out Hiram kills her when she refuses to stop the assassin and tries to leave, using his gravity powers to make her so heavy her body collapses, shattering all her bones. Panicking, he throws an ace of spades card from a nearby deck onto her remains to make the police think that it was the bow-and-arrow killer who murdered her. The police, meanwhile, are looking for a super-strong Ace or Joker, due to the way she was beaten.

When Hiram is finally caught by one of his closest friends Jay Ackroyd and by Yeoman, he is vilified by the Joker community for killing the popular Chrysalis, and several attempts are made on his life. The courts found Hiram guilty of murder, but released him under his own recognizance with the injunction that it is now illegal for him to use his powers. Business at Aces High drops off after Hiram's public fall from grace. Though still a tourist destination, many local Aces stopped frequenting the establishment. Aces High closed some time in the 1990s, and Hiram faded from public life. His current whereabouts are not mentioned in the newest series of books.

Hiram Worchester is a white male of medium height, but considerable girth. Impeccably dressed in expensive suits, Hiram shaves his head, but maintains a perfectly groomed spade beard. Always polite and seemingly unflappable, Hiram speaks with a British accent. He occasionally uses his powers on those who irritate him, such as Digger Downs. Typically, this is harmless, such as making the nosy reporter weightless and then pushing him out the door. A more dangerous loss of control resulted in the death of Chrysalis. During his time as a mount of Ti Malice, Hiram often appeared gaunt, ill groomed, and irritable; a sure sign to those who knew him that something was wrong.

Jetboy

Jetboy (Robert Tomlin) appeared in the short story "Thirty Minutes Over Broadway!" by Howard Waldrop, but is referenced throughout the Wild Cards series. Jetboy is based on pulp magazine and Golden Age "air ace" characters, particularly Airboy. The title of his story is based on Thirty Seconds over Tokyo.

Robert Tomlin was an orphan who always wanted to fly, more than anything else. After running away from an orphanage to an airfield, he was hired by a scientist named Professor Silverberg, who was working on a prototype jet aircraft called the JB-1, and somehow convinced the Professor to let him pilot it. When the Professor was murdered by Nazi spies, Tomlin used the JB-1 to shoot up their getaway car. To his dismay, the spies had diplomatic immunity, and he was forced to flee the country. Once in Canada, he joined the RCAF, and later fought in the Battle of Britain, in the aftermath of one battle being offered tea by Beatrix Potter, and later flew alongside the Flying Tigers in China. In 1945, just before the end of World War II, Jetboy became stranded on a Pacific island for several months. By the time he was rescued, the now 19-year-old Tomlin found that the war was over; and having spent most of his childhood as a fighter pilot, he found it very difficult fitting back into civilian life. He took to watching motion pictures to fill his now-abundant free time.

Meanwhile, Jetboy's arch-enemy, scar-faced crime lord and Nazi sympathizer Dr. Tod, had found the wreck of an "unusual airplane" with a strange pressurized canister inside. When something leaked out and melted one of his henchmen, Tod believed it to be a germ warfare device left over from the war. In fact the downed craft was an alien spacecraft, and the strange canister he had found contained the Wild Card virus. Tod decided to use this "germ-bomb" to perform blackmail on a massive scale; he obtained a multi-gasbag blimp and flew over New York City, announcing by radio that if he did not receive 20 million dollars, he would drop the device (wired with explosives) onto Manhattan. So, on September 15, 1946, Jetboy was once more called into action, along with a squadron of fighters from the United States Army Air Corps. With the only plane able to reach the proper altitude, Jetboy crashed the JB-1 into the gondola, and confronted Dr. Tod faceplate-to-faceplate (both were wearing high-altitude gear). Both men reached for the bomb fuse.

Jetboy's tomb is a major tourist attraction in Manhattan. The statue of Robert Tomlin out front is made from the metal from crashed aircraft. The plaque on the front is engraved with his last words:

I can't die yet, I haven't seen The Jolson Story.

Jumpers
The Jumpers are a criminal gang, first appearing in One-Eyed Jacks, the eighth book of the series. Various Jumpers continue to play a major role in the next three volumes of the series, Jokertown Shuffle, Double Solitaire, and Dealer's Choice. Originally thought to be a lone Ace, known to the media as the Jumper, simultaneous jump attacks in different locations eventually revealed that there was more than one of them.

The Jumpers are a group of mostly teenage criminals with the ability to swap bodies with other people. They are created by Edward St. John Latham, a prominent attorney and secretly a major operative of crime lord Kien Phuc. When Latham is exposed to a new strain of Wild Card virus spread by The Sleeper in his "Typhoid Croyd" phase, he becomes the Ace called Prime, the creator of the Jumpers. Possessing no innate powers in and of himself, Latham could, through sexual contact with others, spread a stable mutation of the virus that endowed the recipient with the power to swap bodies with another. With Latham's taste for teenage runaways and prostitutes (male and female), there was soon a small group of wild card criminals all sharing the same power, committing vicious acts of mayhem and robbery in the body of their chosen victim, then jumping away to freedom. The first recipient of Latham's gift was most likely David Butler, an intern with Latham, Strauss.

Thus began the "Jumper" arm of the Shadow Fists triune organization (the other two branches composed of Joker gangs such as the Werewolves and Asian gangs such as the Immaculate Egrets). Immune to the Jumper power he had bestowed on a variety of teenage boys and girls, Latham was content to create as large an army as his criminal accomplices wished. Based on The Rox (Ellis Island), protected by Bloat's Wall, and under the direct control of a deputy leader (first David and, later, Blaise Andrieux), "Prime" let his Jumpers do as they wished for the most part, occasionally selecting one or two of his more expendable creations for special missions.

During his brief career as an Ace, Latham created dozens of Jumpers. Some of the more notable include Molly Bolt, K.C. Strange, Red, Blackhead, Blaise, and Zelda. Molly Bolt stole Mistral's body and wind powers before the Second Battle of the Rox. K.C. Strange had a brief fling with Captain Trips and helped spring his daughter from government custody. Blaise, Dr. Tachyon's grandson, was their leader until he fled to Takis following the First Battle of the Rox. Zelda was the last Jumper created, literally minutes prior to Latham's death. The leader of the Jumpers after Blaise's departure, Zelda stole Pulse's body and laser powers, eventually dying in combat with Wyungare during the second Battle of the Rox. Two notable characters who wanted to become Jumpers, but were unsuccessful, include Kelly Jenkins and Fantasy. Kelly was a Jumper wannabe who Blaise eventually terrorized into a bizarre body exchange with the alien Dr. Tachyon. Fantasy was a minor Ace that wanted the Jumper power, but mistakenly slept with Mr. Nobody, a shapeshifting Ace disguised as Latham.

The Jumpers used their powers for petty crimes and cruelty, until the "Jump the Rich" scheme proposed by Bloat, which involved jumping wealthy but old or sickly individuals into young, healthy bodies for a steep price, and then offering the same deal to those formerly young and healthy individuals, until their coffers were empty. Most Jumpers were eventually captured by the government and imprisoned in cells lined with one-way mirrors, where they were tricked into jumping into elderly bodies and gassed to death. The Jumpers' power only worked line-of-sight, although one jumper, Zelda, does manage to jump someone during sexual intercourse while blinded.

The remaining Jumpers met their end during the "card sharks" storyline. A group of about a dozen Jumpers had been spared from the Rox and imprisonment and were recruited by the anti-Wild Card conspiracy known as the Card Sharks. Overseen by Philip Baron Von Herzenhagen, the Jumpers were used to augment the Shark's personal attributes, by jumping them into younger more sexually attractive bodies, as well as their collective political power, by jumping their agents into the bodies of politicians. Herzenhagen was using the Jumpers to shepherd anti-wild card legislation through congress. For the coup de grace he intended to jump himself into the body of the President, in order to prevent a veto of said legislation. His plan fell apart when his organization became the target of a revenge scheme by Aces Shad (more properly, Black Shadow) and Croyd Crenson (the previously mentioned Sleeper). In an assault on the Shark's safe house, Shad murdered the remaining Jumpers by using his darkness power to neutralize their abilities, prompting Herzenhagen to ask "how does someone with a shotgun kill a jumper without getting jumped?"

Given the abilities of the Jumpers, it is impossible to definitively state whether or not all of them have been accounted for.

Kelly Jenkins
Kelly Jenkins briefly appeared in One-Eyed Jacks, and became a more prominent character in Jokertown Shuffle and Double Solitaire. A small-town girl, she came to New York with dreams of becoming famous. Instead, after several days on the street, she fell in with a young man named David Butler and the gang of juvenile delinquents that would eventually come to be known as the Jumpers. One of several wannabes awaiting initiation by the Ace known as Prime, Kelly never received the Jumper gift to exchange bodies with their victim. Instead, she fell prey to another Jumper's use of their nearly unstoppable power. Her mind was replaced for an extended period of time with Dr. Tachyon's.

Kid Dinosaur
Kid Dinosaur (Arnie Fentner) was created by Lewis Shiner.

Arnie Fentner was a normal kid, obsessed with dinosaurs and comic books, when the dormant Wild Card virus he'd inherited from his mother turned active, altering his DNA and restructuring his body. He was one of the lucky few who didn't die, and one of the one percent who gained superhuman abilities as a result; in his case, the power to restructure the molecules of his body to assume the shape of any dinosaur that he knew about. The downside was that his body's mass remained constant, so he could only become a kid-sized version of a Tyrannosaurus rex, Pteranodon, or a Triceratops, not to mention the fact that he would burst out of his clothes when transforming, leaving him naked and vulnerable to the elements when he returned to normal. Still, it gave him what he'd always dreamed of: the chance to take part in the adventures of Aces, often playing hooky from school to trail prominent Aces with little regard for his own safety.

This devil-may-care attitude would be his downfall; on one of his excursions, the Kid was captured by the Astronomer and his minions, to be used as a human sacrifice intended to forcibly induct the Ace Water Lily into their cabal. Arnie and Water Lily were ultimately rescued by the impromptu group of Aces organized by Fortunato and Dr. Tachyon to rout the Astronomer's group from their headquarters in The Cloisters. The Astronomer marked all those who'd humiliated him for death, and on Wild Card Day (September 15), 1986, the Astronomer tracked down Arnie in a crowd at Jetboy's tomb, and, as Fortunato watched helplessly, the old man tore Arnie's heart out.

In answer to protests from loyal fans of the character, Wild Cards series editor George R. R. Martin noted in his afterword to the 2004 edition of Jokers Wild (the novel where Kid Dinosaur's death was depicted) that the Kid was created specifically to be a victim of the Astronomer's vengeance.

Kien Phuc
Kien Phuc is a criminal created by John J. Miller in the short story Comes a Hunter, in the first book of the series, Wild Cards.

Kien Phuc (birth name unknown) was born an ethnic Chinese in Vietnam, and was subject to prejudice and poverty during his childhood. His parents tried to teach him honor, but jealousy and greed drove him to reject his parents' simple beliefs and embrace the worst aspects of Vietnamese, and later Western, culture. He changed his name to that of a Vietnamese emperor and adopted an accent and materialistic outlook that he believed would be more acceptable to his host country. He joined the army, rising through the ranks with a combination of talent, ruthlessness, and corruption, reaching the rank of general.

An American officer named Daniel Brennan began investigating him, but Kien framed him for murder and destroyed his evidence, forcing the man to desert. Seeing that the war was not going well for the South, he abandoned the land of his birth and travelled to America, setting himself up as both a successful businessman and a powerful gang leader, ruling a set of organizations collectively known as the Shadow Fist Society.

When a number of Kien's low-ranking thugs, and then an increasing number of higher-ranking operatives, began to turn up dead with arrows in them and the ace of spades card prominently displayed, Kien knew he was being targeted, but thought it was a rival gang; he had no idea that Brennan, the man he'd dismissed from his thoughts so long ago, was now the bow-and-arrow vigilante called Yeoman. It was not until his diary was stolen by Wraith that he would come face to face with his enemy once again.

Kien lost part of his right hand when Wraith turned his gun intangible. He would eventually lose far more than that; he made a deal with the Jumpers to swap him into the body of Fadeout, a Shadow Fist operative who could become invisible. But when his borrowed body was hurt, his mind was eventually lost on the astral plane, his last coherent thought being a guilt-ridden hallucination of his father mourning the loss of his son.

Lazy Dragon
Lazy Dragon (Ben Choy) was created by William F. Wu.

Lazy Dragon is an Ace with the power to project his mind into inanimate objects, with the limitation that they must be shaped like animals, and he must make them by hand. When he projects, the animals grow to life-sized and become animated, while his physical body lies unconscious. He originally carves these animal forms out of materials like soap or vegetables, but later learns the art of origami, allowing him to carry an assortment of animal forms.

Lazy Dragon seemingly has a second, female personality, whom he regards as his sister. At times, she can take over their shared body, which turns female. Lazy Dragon is a member of the Shadow Fists, a prominent New York criminal organization in the Wild Cards universe.

Le Miroir
Le Miroir (Claude Bonnel) first appeared in the short story "Mirrors of the Soul" by Melinda M. Snodgrass, in the fourth Wild Cards book, Aces Abroad.

Claude is a French Ace and minor celebrity, with the ability to alter his facial appearance and a minor telepathic power to sense what a person is thinking of, which he uses to "mirror" a person's favorite individual. He is also a radical socialist and secretly a member of a French terrorist group. Le Miroir is one of those primarily responsible for raising Blaise Jeannot Andrieux, the grandson of the alien Dr. Tachyon, whose quarter-Takisian ancestry gives him a powerful telepathic mind-control ability. He teaches Blaise to use his power as a terror weapon, turning innocent bystanders into unwilling suicide bombers. Although all Wild Cards in France must be registered with the government, Blaise's lack of the Wild Card virus allows him to evade this testing.

When Tachyon discovers his grandson is being used in this way, he shoots Claude and, to protect Blaise, publicly claims that the telepathic Miroir was the mind-controller, who had downplayed his mental abilities to the public.

Loophole
Loophole (St. John Latham) first appeared in volume III, "Jokers Wild". He was created by George R. R. Martin. Senior partner in one of New York's most successful law firms, St. John Latham represented a family of companies with their headquarters in the Bahamas and subsidiaries including CariBank and Shrike Music. In reality, these businesses were fronts for a ruthless criminal organization known as the Shadow Fists. Latham had earned the name Loophole as a mercilessly effective lawyer with the ability to wriggle his clients out of any charges. An important figure in the Shadow Fist organization, Loophole also went under the alias Prime as leader/creator of the Jumpers.

Latham contracted a dose of the virus during the brief outbreak of a wildly contagious mutant strain caused by the Sleeper. Surviving the incubation period, Latham emerged as an Ace with a bizarre ability. Possessing no innate powers himself, Latham could, through sexual contact with others, spread a stable mutation of the virus that endowed the recipient with the power to swap bodies with another. With Latham's taste for teenage runaways and prostitutes (male and female), soon there was a small group of wild card criminals all sharing the same power, committing vicious acts of mayhem and robbery in the body of their chosen victim, then jumping away to freedom.

Once calculating and almost untouchable, Latham's behavior grew ever more risky and erratic after the death of his favorite lover/Jumper, David, at the hands of the Oddity. One of his jumpers gave aging Shadow Fist crime lord Kien Phuc the youthful Ace body of Fadeout. He made a gift of the famous Bosch painting The Temptation of Saint Anthony to the Joker revolutionary called Bloat. When confronted by Bloat about the foolishness of allowing Blaise to jump a high-profile figure like Tachyon, he was utterly unconcerned. Latham finally met his end at the hands of the Ace Mr. Nobody, also known as Jerry Strauss. Mr. Nobody's brother was the Strauss in the law office of Latham, Strauss. Bent upon revenge after Latham had his brother murdered, Nobody investigated Loophole's criminal activities for months. Shortly after Latham had made Zelda a jumper, Mr. Nobody tracked the lawyer to his hotel room. The ace killed Latham by using his shapeshifting power to stab an elongated fingerbone into his brain and liquifying it.

Modular Man
Modular Man is an android created by Maxim Travnicek and first appeared in Wild Cards II: Aces High.

Mr. Nobody
Mr. Nobody (Jerry Strauss) first appeared in "the Projectionist", a throwaway cameo in the story "Shell Games" by George R. R. Martin.

Jeremiah Strauss was a wealthy playboy, who wanted more than anything to be in show business. When he became infected with the Wild Card virus and found himself with minor shapeshifting powers, he developed an act of sorts, doing celebrity "impressions" at clubs, but his lack of success drove him to a nervous breakdown in 1965. He was transformed into a King Kong analogue called the Great Ape, which was quickly captured by New York's abundant Ace heroes. His transformation also caused a blackout all across New York and parts of New Jersey. Every few years thereafter, he would escape from the zoo, grab the nearest attractive blonde, and attempt to climb the Empire State Building; thanks to New York's Aces, he never made it more than halfway.

In "The Teardrop of India", the Great Ape is brought to Sri Lanka to shoot a film; coincidentally the "Aces Abroad" world tour is also in Sri Lanka at the time. When a precognitive vision from G.C. Jayewardine shows that the Great Ape is actually a transformed Ace, Dr. Tachyon manages to unlock Strauss' submerged consciousness and return him to normal.

When his attorney brother is killed by his law partner St. John Latham, Jerry manages to use his skills to discover the culprit and get revenge, eventually killing Latham in his own penthouse. As his powers and confidence slowly rise to new levels, Strauss becomes a more prominent character in the later novels, eventually becoming the partner of private detective Jay Ackroyd.

Jerry Strauss can shapeshift to look like anyone he imagines, usually choosing film stars. He can also increase his size and mass, though doing so can black out electricity around him. It is theorized by Dr. Tachyon that at least some of this mass is actually converted from the electrical energy he absorbs. He is able to use his malleability to pick locks and vehicle ignitions by forcing a finger into the keyhole and conforming to the proper shape, though it is painful to do so since his finger is not as durable as a genuine key. In addition, driving a vehicle that he has commandeered in this fashion is awkward, as he is forced to drive one-handed and in pain while keeping his finger in the ignition slot. He can also cause certain drastic, inhuman changes to his appearance, such as making his flesh appear to run like melting wax, or elongating a pointed fingerbone out of his flesh (the method he used to kill St. John Latham, extending the bone into Latham's ear canal and literally "scrambling" his brain matter). Strauss' primary limitation is reliance on a basically humanoid shape; to date, he has never assumed a form that was not basically humanoid (such as non-humanoid animals), or appeared able to stretch or deform his body (a la Mister Fantastic or Plastic Man) on a grand scale.

Originally a poor actor and impressionist, he has honed his skills to a much greater degree since returning to normal life (after years as the Great Ape). He has also developed investigative skills and learned the rudiments of computer hacking. Strauss is also a millionaire, and has access to all the resources that wealth can provide.

Peregrine
Peregrine was created by Gail Gerstner-Miller and first appeared in Wild Cards (1987).

Peregrine might technically be considered a Joker, since the Wild Card virus left her with a visible "deformity", a pair of giant wings. However, the majestic nature of her wings, combined with her physical beauty and charisma, made her a darling of the Ace set. Indeed, Peregrine is one of the most famous Wild Cards, and famous women, in the world. Although Peregrine occasionally engaged in super-heroics, often using a set of steel claws to enhance her combat effectiveness, she was primarily known for her activities as a celebrity. She is the host of the popular and long running talk show "Peregrines Perch" as well as being an important television personality and sex symbol who appeared in Playboy magazine. As a famous media figure she was a fixture of New York society, although she was not above "slumming", such as with her brief relationship with the Wild Card pimp Fortunato, which resulted an unplanned pregnancy.

In 1986, Peregrine was one of a number of Americans chosen to take part in a World Health Organization fact-finding tour. While in Japan, Peregrine met Fortunato and convinced him to help Hiram Worcester, who had gotten into trouble with the Yakuza. Although Fortunato learned of her pregnancy and that he was the father, he chose not to remain with her and would instead enter a monastery. Peregrine would give birth to a son and named him John Fortune. During a stopover in Egypt, Peregrine was given a disturbing prophecy about her son's future. This prophecy made Peregrine a very protective mother. While she lived her life in the public eye, and indeed became even more of a celebrity, she jealously guarded her son's privacy and safety, routinely employing Popinjay and his detective agency to guard him. In 2003, John Fortune's Wild Card "turned" and John became the object of contest between two groups of religious fanatics. What at first appeared to be an Ace turned out to be a deadly "black queen" which would have resulted in John's death if not for the intervention of Fortunato. Apparently left powerless, John returned to an ordinary life, working as a production assistant on a new Wild Card–themed show his mother was producing. In 2008, his role in prophecy was fulfilled as he became the host for the Egyptian Ace Sekhmet and worked with other aces to defend Egypt's Jokers from genocide.

Popinjay
Jay "Popinjay" Ackroyd is an Ace who can teleport people and things anywhere he can clearly visualize. He cannot use this power on himself, and he has to be able to point his index fingers at his target (holding his hand like a pistol).

Jay Ackroyd is a private investigator, running the Ackroyd and Creighton Detective Agency with his junior partner, Mr. Nobody. Known as 'Popinjay' amongst his fellow Wild Carders, his power, especially combined with his quick wits, makes him a deceptively dangerous opponent.

In the early 1990s, Ackroyd accompanied Dr. Tachyon to his homeworld of Takis. While he was on Takis, he was captured by Blaise Andrieux, who chopped off his fingers to prevent him from using his powers. After Blaise's defeat, they were grown back by Takisian technology. Since then, Ackroyd has married a Takisian chef and returned to earth and to his increasingly high-profile detective/bodyguard agency, which now employs Aces such as Peter Pann.

Jay's favorite saying is: "Might as well, I can't dance".

Puppetman
Puppetman, the alias of Gregg Hartmann, a U.S. Senator (D-NY) and candidate for the Democratic presidential nomination, first appeared in the story "Strings" by Stephen Leigh in the first book in the series, and plays an important role in events throughout the series. Hartmann shows the world the face of a crusading, man-of-the-people politician, who fights for the rights of the downtrodden, particularly Jokers, but who is secretly an Ace possessed of mind-control powers. Hartmann refers to these powers, and the desire he gets to use them, as "Puppetman" and sees them as almost a separate entity.

Hartmann himself is a victim of the Wild Card, an Ace with the ability to sense and manipulate the emotions of others. He first discovered this power when he was eleven years old; he had a crush on a teenage girl named Andrea Whitman, and wanted to find a way to hurt her for ignoring him. He took his first puppet that day, Roger Pellman, a mentally deficient fourteen-year-old, and began stoking Pellman's anger, lust, and rage until Pellman raped and murdered Andrea, with Gregg feeling everything his puppet felt.

This incident fractured the boy's fragile psyche, with pleasure, hate, guilt, shame, fear, and sex all jumbled together in his already twisted mind. He could not bear to think of these horrific actions as his own doing, so he created the Puppetman: another person in his mind, and the one he blamed for all the things he'd done... and all he would continue to do.

Hartmann became addicted to "feeding" on the negative emotions and psychic pain of others. For years, he both reveled in, and was repulsed by, the many violent crimes and atrocities he committed by proxy. He used his power of emotional influence to become a successful politician; he could make anyone his "puppet" simply through brief physical contact, and a politician shakes a lot of hands.

Hartmann became overconfident of his control over others, when in fact he could not even control himself. Puppetman was becoming an independent, and demanding, force in his mind, constantly hungering for more. At times things spiralled out of his hands; in one case, he touched off a riot, and the resulting overwhelming emotional feedback caused him to have an embarrassing public breakdown that cost him the presidency.

In the sixth volume of the Wild Cards series, Ace in the Hole (1990), the assassin Demise is hired to kill Sen. Hartmann. Demise's own Ace abilities allow him to kill by locking eyes with his intended victim and telepathically projecting the memory of his death into their mind. Amid the chaos generated by Hartmann's manipulation of the Democratic National Convention in Atlanta, Demise got close enough to his target to initiate, but not complete, his death-stare. The result was that Puppetman, who was dominant at the time, was destroyed, leaving behind only the normal half of Hartmann's personality. Hartmann resolved to undo the damage caused by Puppetman, but before he could begin, Dr. Tachyon telepathically coerced Hartmann into the embarrassing breakdown that cost him the Democratic nomination.

Afterwards, Hartmann is jumped into the body of a caterpillar-like Joker. He swings from villain to victim to hero, trying to redeem himself of the horrible deeds he has committed.

Over the course of his career, Puppetman has manipulated literally hundreds of individuals, some to a greater extent than others. The following is a brief list of his many puppets: Carnifex (Hartmann's bodyguard), Gimli (militant Joker's rights activist), Kahina (clairvoyant sister of the radical Islamic Ace Nur al Allah, who later discovers Hartmann's secret), Mackie Messer (German Ace), Molniya (Soviet Ace), The Oddity (Joker vigilante), Peanut (Joker), Black Shadow (Ace vigilante) and Hiram Worchester (popular restaurateur and Ace).

Quasiman
Quasiman is a Joker created by author Arthur Byron Cover. He does not remember his past or his real name, nor indeed any information prior to his transformation. He is large and powerfully built, but with a hunched back and twisted spine. Quasiman is the caretaker of the Church of Jesus Christ, Joker in New York's Jokertown, having been hired by Father Squid shortly after the church opened.

Quasiman has superhuman strength and can teleport, but his powers come with a price; his body is constantly in flux, with molecules moving back and forth in space and time while still staying part of him. Because of this, his mind has difficulty focusing. At times his thoughts are clear and lucid; but those times are few and far between, and never last very long. Usually it is an effort for him just to remember what he was going to do, or if he'd already done it, or if his memories are of the past or future. Occasionally parts of his body will phase out of existence, then back in again.

Quasiman is not a major character, but plays a significant role twice; he is resuscitated by "faith healer" Reverend Leo Barnett, which gains Barnett enough public recognition and sympathy to later be elected president. Later, he is involved in Detective Hannah Davis' investigation of the burning down of the church, which gets him entangled in uncovering the Card Sharks conspiracy.

Righteous Djinn
The Righteous Djinn is an Ace. He appears in the book Inside Straight as a minor character who can absorb the powers of other Aces. He also has immense strength and can become a 30-foot giant. He serves as a bodyguard to the Caliph of the Modern Caliph. He is killed by a group of American Aces (Lohengrin, Rustbelt, Drummer Boy, Bubbles, John Fortune/Sekhmet) at the end of Inside Straight.

Roulette
Roulette was created by Melinda M. Snodgrass in "mosaic novel" Wild Cards III: Jokers Wild.

Roulette Brown-Roxbury did not know that she carried the Wild Card virus until she gave birth to a horribly deformed, stillborn Joker. Her upper-class husband Josiah refused to believe that he too carried the Wild Card, insisting that Roulette must have had an affair, and finally divorced her. Spiralling into depression, Roulette eventually became a prostitute to support herself. She then discovered the other effect of the Wild Card; she sometimes produced a deadly neurotoxin during sex, and in time earned the nickname "Russian Roulette" among those patrons who knew of her ability. Sex with her became a risky status symbol, like that of eating fugu fish in Japan. Eventually, she learned to produce this poison at will by concentrating on the horrific memories of giving birth.

It was then that she was discovered by The Astronomer, who (as he had with Demise), offered to erase her painful memories if she worked for him. Just as with Demise, he had no intention of doing so as long as she proved useful. First, on September 15, 1986, Wild Card Day (the anniversary of Jetboy's death) the Astronomer had Roulette kill an Ace hero named "The Howler", who had taken part in one of the Astronomer's previous defeats. The Howler's death was merely the first of many tragic stories to make the news that fateful day.

Next Roulette was told to seduce and kill Dr. Tachyon, the alien inventor of the Wild Card virus. At first she was quite determined to get her revenge on the man ultimately responsible for her suffering and that of many others. But after spending time with Tachyon, seeing how "human" he actually was, how guilt-stricken and how dedicated he was to helping the virus' victims, she came to gradually care for him. When the Astronomer was finally killed, Roulette chose to leave Tachyon alive, and to leave town to try to live with her own memories.

In the fifth book of the series, Down and Dirty, Roulette returns to New York and becomes infected with Typhoid Croyd's mutated strain of Wild Card virus, resulting in her death. Her infection is what convinces Tachyon that the virus can now reinfect Jokers and Aces.

Sleeper
The Sleeper (Croyd Crenson) was created by Roger Zelazny.

In September 1946, ninth-grader Croyd Crenson, native of an unspecified borough of the New York City metropolitan area, was one of the first victims of the alien virus dubbed "the Wild Card", which generates random mutations in humans, many times leading to an altered appearance and/or superhuman abilities. In Croyd's case, however, his mutation induces the virus to periodically re-infect his body (similar to malaria), causing him to develop a different appearance and set of powers every time he sleeps. Fortunately, the primary constant among these changes is an altered sleep cycle: he can spend anywhere from days to weeks at a time with no need for sleep, followed by equally varying periods of extended sleep, analogous to a pupal stage, during which his body alters to a new configuration. Croyd's root mutation is generally considered that of an Ace, though the classification of his abilities changes from mutation to mutation. He shows no sign of the effects of advancing age, though in the later eras depicted in the novels he would be approaching his sixties.

Croyd constantly fears that he will one day wake up as a permanent Joker, immune to the virus, or that it will simply kill him, as the virus does to the majority of those it infects (known as "drawing the Black Queen"). As he starts to feel tired, he usually turns to amphetamines to stay awake, becoming increasingly violent and paranoid. Depending on where he is in his sleep/wake cycle, he can be a friendly rogue, a coldly brutal mercenary, a twitchy junkie and thief, or a deadly, raving psychotic.

His unique sleep cycle and constantly altering appearance makes it all but impossible for Croyd to hold down a regular job, and he usually supports himself through criminal activity (though in later years he begins investing in the stock market as a supplement to his income). This began after Croyd's initial transformation, when his father had died. Martial law was still imposed in New York City in the wake of the initial wave of Wild Card victims, and stealing was the only reliable way to acquire necessary supplies for himself and his family. Later, he continued to steal to support his family, as his father had suffered a fatal reaction to the virus and his mother had slowly gone insane from witnessing her husband's death, leaving Croyd the primary source of income for his brother and sister. This continued until his siblings became adults and his sister married, when Croyd, who had awakened before his latest change was complete, unintentionally disrupted the wedding ceremony when he fully transformed into a gargoyle-like creature. Croyd seems to have completely broken ties with his family after the wedding incident.

Croyd has worked on and off over the years with a small-time career criminal named Bentley, whom he first met as a Joker with a dog-like appearance, after waking up from his initial transformation. Bentley would later volunteer for the risky treatment developed for the Wild Card called the Trump virus, and was one of the lucky few who was completely cured. Bentley has shared some of his tricks of the trade, and sometimes plans robberies for Croyd, based on whatever superhuman powers he wakes up with, in exchange for a share of the proceeds. The pair have little concern for police investigation, as by the time the authorities begin to recognize Croyd's current form and abilities, he is usually "lying low" and changing into a new, unrecognizable form.

Using his ill-gotten gains, Croyd has established several living spaces of various size and quality throughout New York City, so that he is never too far from at least one of them when he is unable to stay awake. At least one of these is located in Jokertown, NYC's former Bowery district that has become a local haven to those unfortunate enough to "draw the Joker". Croyd made efforts early on to establish a base there and make friends within the Joker community, knowing that on the occasions that he assumes a Joker form, he will have to live among them.

Croyd has assumed any number of forms in the decades since his initial infection: Ace, Joker, and, once, an almost completely non-powered human form. His first form was that of a hair-covered Joker with the ability to turn invisible. Various Ace powers he has manifested during his waking periods include the ability to melt metal, enhanced speed and reflexes, heat conduction, flight, and super strength. Often Croyd awakened with a mixture of the Joker/Ace traits. During his stint as a fact finder for the Mafia, the Sleeper was a handsome brown haired Ace with strong bioelectric abilities and faceted, mirror-like compound eyes.

Arguably, Croyd's most dangerous form was his incarnation as a super strong albino. During this period the Sleeper's Ace power manufactured a contagious, mutated form of the Wild Card virus that could re-infect and re-mutate those already transformed. Dubbed "Typhoid Croyd" (a reference to the historical Typhoid Mary), he was subdued and quarantined before this new infection became widespread and created a panic similar to the original wave of infections in 1946. It is notable that at least one person he re-infected, the Joker Snotman, had his quality of life improved, as Snotman was re-mutated into an Ace. Amongst others infected during his Typhoid Croyd phase include high-priced lawyer Loophole Latham, the Ace Water Lily, militant Joker activist Gimili, call girl/assassin Roulette, washed-up rock hero Buddy Holly (who did not die young in the Wild Cards universe, as he did in real life) and the android Modular Man's creator Maxim Travnicek – who loses his ability to repair Modular Man as he mutates into a Joker.

In the late 1990s, Croyd would team up with the Ace vigilante Shad after the two had been imprisoned on Governors Island at the behest of the "Card Sharks" conspiracy. Seeking revenge, the two men organized a prison breakout and then killed most of the remaining Card Sharks. Croyd was last seen traveling with Shad to Afghanistan, where one of the lead Card Sharks had been doing humanitarian work.

Snotman
Snotman (Bill Lockwood) was originally a Joker derelict who oozed a snot-like mucus from every pore of his body. However, in Wild Cards volume V: Down and Dirty, he had an encounter with Croyd Crenson, better known as The Sleeper, during a time when Crenson's mutation had developed a contagious version of the Wild Card virus. Snotman, whose real name was Bill Lockwood, was infected by "Typhoid Croyd". This time he became an Ace. The new Wild Card infection reversed his previous disability, apparently restoring him to his pre-Wild Card appearance as a fairly handsome man. It also gave him the ability to absorb any energy directed against him, including kinetic energy, and then release it back at his opponents. He teamed up with Croyd but was subdued by Black Shadow, operating under his Mr, Gravemold identity, who drained the heat from him until he collapsed. Taken into custody, Lockwood, who was now styling himself Reflector, was recruited to participate in the military action against the Rox, the Joker enclave on Ellis Island. Despite himself having been a Joker, Reflector exhibited an unusual distaste for Jokers, born of his time living in Jokertown when even other Jokers looked down on him and treated him poorly.

Ti Malice
Ti Malice first appeared in the fourth book of the series, Aces Abroad, in the short story "Beasts of Burden" by John J. Miller. This character is named after the Vodou Loa, Ti Malice.

The being known only as Ti Malice is a Haitian Joker who acts as a parasite on other people. He is a foetus-sized Joker with shrivelled, useless limbs, and a poorly-developed digestive system. He gets both nutrition and mobility by attaching himself to the neck of another person, connecting himself to their nervous system, and injecting an incredibly addictive substance that he refers to as "the kiss". While connected with his mounts Ti Malice is able to control them fully, in fact he becomes the bodies dominant personality, with the mounts personality existing in a hazy dream like state. When disconnected from Ti Malice the mounts feel great anxiety, and their longing for his "kiss" is enough to keep them in line.

Ti Malice views his "mounts" as expendable toys for his own amusement, revelling in all forms of vicarious sensations, from pleasure to pain. He uses a beautiful mount called Ezili-Je-Rouge, who poses as a prostitute, to lure new victims into his presence. In this way he was able to acquire wealthy American Ace Hiram Worchester as a mount; Worchester then shipped Ti Malice to New York City, where Malice was able to find even more depravity to enjoy. One of those he used in this way was the Ace Water Lily.

When Ti Malice took Blaise Andrieux as a mount, the boy's grandfather Dr. Tachyon hired Ace investigator Jay Ackroyd to find him. Ackroyd, discovering the location of Ti Malice, teleported the Joker into a scene from his worst nightmare, effectively ending his threat forever. Many years later the Ace Billy Ray was traveling through a pocket dimension and encountered Ti Malice, killing him.

Wraith
Wraith (Jennifer Maloy) was created by John J. Miller, and first appeared in the third book, Jokers Wild.

Jennifer Maloy was an attractive but introverted librarian until the day she discovered she was an Ace, gifted with the ability to become insubstantial. She used this power to emulate the romantic heroes of her favorite stories as the Wraith, robbing from the corrupt rich and giving to the poor (mostly charities benefiting battered women and pets). However, the limitations of her powers—that she could only "ghost" items of low mass and density—determined not only that her "work clothes" would consist only of a mask and a bikini, but it also limited what she could steal to small, mostly paper goods.

Jennifer enjoyed her new adventurous lifestyle, but found more adventure than she wanted when she stole a few small books from the safe of businessman and gangster Kien Phuc, because one of those books was actually his personal diary, with details of all his illegal activities going back years. Now wanted by the ruthless crime lord, she was fortunate enough to encounter Daniel Brennan, the vigilante called Yeoman, who also wished to get his hands on Kien's diary. Since Wraith could only use her power for short periods, she was forced to rely on Brennan for protection. After several close escapes from Kien and his thugs—including an encounter in which Wraith mutilated Kien's hand—she handed the book over to Brennan, only to discover that its pages were blank; the extravagant Kien had written his journal in gold ink, which was too dense for Wraith's power to affect. The paper had easily passed through the walls of the safe, but the gold had remained inside.

Wraith would eventually leave New York to live with Brennan, returning only once, as Yeoman tried to solve the murder of Chrysalis. Wraith nearly lost her own life in the process, but was rescued again by Yeoman. The two moved away and have not been seen since.

Xavier Desmond
Xavier Desmond was created by George R. R. Martin.

Xavier Desmond was a 29-year-old investment banker with a wife and young daughter when the Wild Card virus first struck the world in 1946. He was one of the lucky few who survived, developing a trunk-like prehensile nose, tipped with seven functioning fingers. He immediately experienced the prejudice of being a Joker, losing his family and his job, and along with other victims of the Wild Card moved into New York City's Bowery section, which would eventually be renamed Jokertown.

Desmond would go on to found the "Jokers' Anti-Defamation League", or JADL, the world's leading Jokers' rights organization. He became one of the Joker activists most widely known to the general public, earning him the nickname "the unofficial mayor of Jokertown". Some of the younger generation of angrier, more radical Jokers felt disdain for Desmond's work-within-the-system attitude and mocked his "mayoral" status, particularly the violent Joker terrorist Gimli, who compared the polite and soft-spoken Desmond to a Joker version of Uncle Tom.

Xavier Desmond was one of a number of high-profile Jokers, Aces, and reporters asked by the World Health Organization to go on a "World Tour" to examine the status of Jokers in various countries worldwide. In Wild Cards IV: Aces Abroad, the recurring inter-story segments titled "From The Journal of Xavier Desmond" tell a great deal about Desmond's life and feelings, and also reveal that he is dying of cancer. The "Journal" segments also show some behind-the-scenes looks at the events on an airplane full of conflicting personalities.

Xavier Desmond died July 16, 1987, at the Blythe Van Rensselaer Memorial Clinic (commonly known as the Jokertown Clinic). The last, proud words written in his journal were, "My name was Xavier Desmond, and I was a man".

Yeoman
Yeoman (Daniel Brennan) was created by John J. Miller and first appeared in the short story "Comes a Hunter" in the first book of the series. A masked, bow and arrow wielding vigilante, Yeoman was, for several years, a deadly menace to the criminal element of New York, especially the Immaculate Egrets and their parent organization the Shadow Fists. An early high point of Yeoman's career was helping end the Swarm menace, alongside Dr. Tachyon, Fortunato, and the female Ace healer known as Mai.

Daniel Brennan was a captain in the U.S. Army during the Vietnam War, where he was involved in numerous covert operations. He discovered that there was a high-ranking traitor within the ranks of the Army of the Republic of Vietnam (ARVN) who was selling military secrets to the enemy. After tracing the information back to ARVN General Kien Phuc, Brennan made the mistake of trying to confront the general. Kien framed Brennan for the murder of his superior officer and destroyed the evidence Brennan had collected, leaving him no choice but to desert the army and flee the country.

It is not clear what Brennan did during the following years, but he may have served as a mercenary for a time before meeting a roshi named Ishida who helped him learn to discipline his emotions. Brennan spent many years studying the martial arts and became exceptionally skilled in Zen archery. Although he became quite calm and precise in his actions, he never succeeded in finding inner peace.

In the early 1980s, Brennan received a letter from one of his former Vietnamese compatriots, telling him that Kien Phuc had been seen in America. Despite being a wanted man, Brennan journeyed to New York City to hunt down Kien and complete his final mission. When he arrived, he found that his friend had been killed by one of the gangs controlled by Kien, who now wore the guise of a legitimate business tycoon. Donning a mask and the name Yeoman, and taking up the recurve bow, Brennan began to systematically kill Kien's thugs and enforcers, each time leaving behind the same symbol he'd marked his kills with in Vietnam... the Ace of Spades.

In searching for information about Kien, he came in contact with a strange yet fascinating woman: the transparent but mysterious Joker known as Chrysalis. Chrysalis and Brennan would have a torrid on-again off-again affair for several years, before finally separating for good.

Brennan would later become involved with a girl who was Chrysalis' polar opposite; optimistic instead of cynical, open instead of manipulative, and whereas Chrysalis looked like a ghost but was actually solid, Wraith looked normal but could turn insubstantial at will.

Yeoman first met Wraith when he learned she had stolen Kien's personal diary, which could give Brennan damning evidence against Kien, perhaps enough to bring him down for good. But after Wraith and Yeoman fought a virtual war against Kien and his minions over possession of the diary, it all turned out to be for nothing; the diary had been written in gold ink, gold being something that Wraith couldn't "ghost", and whatever writing had been in it had been left inside the wall of Kien's office safe. Brennan, on the verge of exploding at the news, abruptly realised that Kien wasn't to know that the pages had been blanked, and instead burst into a good, long belly laugh, the first he'd had in years.

In time, Brennan lost much of his anger toward Kien and retired to the countryside with Wraith. He returned to New York once, when Chrysalis was murdered.

Daniel Brennan has had cosmetic surgery to add epicanthic folds to his eyes in order to infiltrate Kien's mostly-Asian gangs. Between his military experience and his martial arts training, he is a skilled and deadly fighter, with bare hands and an assortment of weapons. Though a crack shot, his preferred weapon is either the Japanese longbow or the compound bow, which he used extensively during his time in New York. As Yeoman he wore plain clothes and a hood-like mask.

References

External links 
 

 
Lists of literary characters